This is a list of educational institutes of Sylhet, Bangladesh.

Universities 
 Shahjalal University of Science and Technology
 Sylhet Agricultural University
 Sylhet Engineering College
 Leading University
 Metropolitan University, Sylhet
 North East University
 Sylhet International University
 Army Institute of Business Administration, Sylhet

British Curriculum schools 
Mentioned below are the renowned British Curriculum schools in Sylhet

Cambridge Curriculum
 RISE (Royal Institute of Smart Education)

Edexcel Curriculum
 Anandaniketan
 Banyan British School
 Cambridge Grammar School & College
 Oxford International School & College Sylhet
 Presidency School & College
 Sylhet Grammar School
 Sylhet International School & College
 The Sylhet Khajanchibari International School & College
 Sunny Hill International School
 Kawsarabad International School
 British Bangladesh International School & College

Technical colleges 
 Sylhet Professional Technical Institute (SPTI)
 British Engineering College
 Sylhet Polytechnic Institute
 Islami Bank Institute of Technology
 Impt Medical technology College

Law colleges 
 Sylhet Law College
 Metropolitan Law College

Masters level colleges 
 Madan Mohan College
 Murari Chand College

Degree colleges (honors) 
 Dakshin Surma College
 Sylhet Government Women's College
 Dhakadakshin Government College

Degree colleges (pass) 
 Biswanath Degree College
 Beanibazar Adarsha Mohila College
 Fenchuganj Degree College
 Moinuddin Adarsha Mohila College
 Shah Khurrom Degree College
 Sylhet Government College
 Dhakadakshin Government College
 Nari Sikkha Academy Degree College
 Tajpur Degree College

Intermediate colleges
 Blue Bird High School and College
 Border Guard Public School & College, Akhalia
 Dhakadakshin Multilateral High School and College
 Hazrat Shahjalal (RH) College
 Jalalabad Cantonment English School and College
 Jalalabad Cantonment Public School & College
 Jalalabad University College
 Kawsarabad College
 Kurar Bazar College
 Government Mohammad Chowdhury Academy Model School and College
 Scholarshome
 Shahjalal Jamia Islamia School & College
 Starlight College, South Surma
 State College, Housing Estate
 Sylhet Cantonment Public School and College
 Sylhet Central College
 Sylhet Commerce College
 Sylhet Govt. Commercial Institute
 Sylhet Govt. Model School & College
 Sylhet Science And Technology College
 Sylhet Science College

Medical colleges 
 Sylhet MAG Osmani Medical College 
 Jalalabad Ragib-Rabeya Medical College
 Sylhet Women's Medical College
 North East Medical College
 Park View Medical College, Sylhet https://pmch.edu.bd/
 Sylhet Central Dental College

Medical institutes 
 Govt. Institute of Health Technology, Sylhet
 North East Institute of Health Technology, Sylhet.https://www.nemc.edu.bd/institute-of-health-technology/

Madrasas 
 Badedwral Fultoli Kamil Madrasha. Zokiganj Sylhet
 Hazrat Shah Jalal Darussunah Yaqubiya Kamil Madrsha. Subhanighad, Sylhet
 Jalalia Senior Fazil Degree Madrasah, Jalalpur, Dokkin Surma, Sylhet.
 Beanibazar Senior Madrasha
 Boiragi Bazar Madrasa, Beanibazar
 Boraya Uttorbag Alia Madrasha, Sreerampur
 Boroikandi Islamia Fazill Madrasha
 Fulshaind Darul Kerath Dhakil Madrasa
 Hadrat Ali (r.a) Academy
 Jamea Abu Huraira Ra. Al-Islamia
 Jamia Islamia Hossainia
 Jamia Madania Angura Muhammad Pur
 Jamia Madania Islamia Kazir Bazar
 Jamia Munawa International Madrasah
 Jamia Tawakkulia Renga Madrasah
 Jannatul Ummah Girls Dakhil Madrasah Mathiura
 Lalabazar Alim Madrasa
 Lamligram Madrasa, Beanibazar
 Lawai Islami Dakhil Madrasha
 Madrasah-e-Tayibia Taheria Helimia Sunnia
 Mathiura Senior Fazil Madrasa
 Mullabari Jamea Islamia Dakhil Madrasa
 Sagornal Senior Alim Madrasha
 Satpur Kamil Madrasah,  Lamakazi, Bishwanath.
 Serajul Islam Alim Madrasha
 Shahjalal Academy, Subidbazar
 Shahjalal Cadet Madrasah
 Shahjalal Jamia Islamea Kamil Madrasha Pathantula, Sylhet
 Sirajul Islam Alim Madrasah, Sylhet Sadar
 Sujaul Senior Fazil Madrasha
 Sylhet Cadet Madrasah
 Sylhet Government Alia Madrasah
 Alapur Girls Madrasa Kaligonj bazaar
 Atapur Madrasa
 Sultanpur Madrasa
 Gorpur Madrasa

High schools 
Ram Sundar Pilot High School

References 

Education in Sylhet District
Educational institutions in Sylhet